The  is a Japanese DC electric multiple unit (EMU) commuter train type operated by the private railway operator Tobu Railway on Tobu Skytree Line and Tokyo Metro Hibiya Line inter-running services since 7 July 2017.

Variants
70000 series (in service since 7 July 2017)
70090 series (in service since 20 March 2020)

70000 series

Overview
The 70000 series trains are scheduled to replace the 20000 series EMUs used on Tobu Skytree Line and Tokyo Metro Hibiya Line inter-running services. A unified door arrangement with four pairs per side instead of the mixture of three and five pairs per side on the 20000 series trains allows the installation of platform edge doors on the Tokyo Metro Hibiya Line once the older train fleets have been replaced. The trains use permanent-magnet synchronous motors (PMSM), offering 25% energy savings compared to the motors used in earlier 20000 series trains.

Formation
The 70000 series trains are formed as seven-car sets as shown below, with car 1 at the northern end. Each car is motored, with only the outer axle on each bogie motored.

Car 4 has two single-arm pantographs, and cars 2 and 6 each have one.

Interior
Internally, the trains use LED lighting throughout. Three 17-inch LCD passenger information displays are provided above each doorway. Wheelchair spaces are provided at one end of each car.

History

Details of the new 70000 series trains on order were officially announced on 17 June 2015, together with details of the Tokyo Metro 13000 series to be introduced around the same time. The entire fleet of new trains is scheduled to be delivered between fiscal 2016 and fiscal 2019, with the first set delivered from Kinki Sharyo in February 2017.

The first trains entered revenue service on 7 July 2017.

Build histories
The delivery dates for the fleet are as shown below.

70090 series

The 70090 series trains are used on Tobu and Tokyo Metro Hibiya Line interrunning services, and were introduced into service on 20 March 2020. They feature a different exterior color scheme than the 70000 series. The service on which these trains operate, branded , offers reserved seating.

Interior
The sets have seats that can be arranged longitudinally or transversely.

Build histories
The manufacturers and delivery dates for the fleet are as shown below.

References

External links

 Official press release 
 Kinki Sharyo press release 

Electric multiple units of Japan
70000 series
Train-related introductions in 2017
Kinki Sharyo multiple units
1500 V DC multiple units of Japan